Anthidium spiniventre is a species of bee in the family Megachilidae, the leaf-cutter, carder, or mason bees.

Synonyms
Synonyms for this species include:
Anthidium spiniventre var melanopygum Friese, 1917
Anthidium (Anthidium) spiniventre melanopygum'' Friese, 1917

References

spiniventre
Insects described in 1899